Brugal is the name and brand of a variety of rums from the Dominican Republic produced by Brugal & Co., C. por A. Brugal and the other Dominican rums, Barceló and Bermúdez, are collectively known as the three B's. Brugal has three distilleries, one in Puerto Plata and two in San Pedro de Macorís.

Company history

During the second half of the 19th century, Andrés Brugal Montaner, a Spanish national who had migrated from Sitges, Catalonia, Spain to Santiago de Cuba, decided to move to the Dominican Republic and take up permanent residence in Puerto Plata. While in Cuba, Don Andrés acquired expertise in the making of rum, and based on that experience he founded Brugal & Co. in Puerto Plata, the company produces several different kinds of rum. After introducing its dark rum into the market in 1888. It would mark the beginning of a long family tradition. Don Andrés, unknowingly, would become the forebearer of entrepreneurial leadership in Dominican society. In 1920 the company's first warehouses were built for the ageing of rum in oak barrels.

By 1976, with Extraviejo, the company developed the Premium rum segment in Dominican Republic. In 1998 Brugal & Co. launched Brugal Limón, Brugal Pasión and Unico. In 2005, the company launched 5-liter steel dispensing barrels for its medium and low-tier brands. Today, the chairman George Arzeno Brugal and most of the board members are direct descendants of the founder of the company.

Brugal is enjoyed neat, over ice, mixed with Coca-Cola ("Coke") which is commonly referred to as a "cuba libre", mixed with 7-up which is commonly referred to as a ‘santo libre’. Some people mix Brugal with fresh fruit juices. It is also usually the main ingredient in Mama Juana which is a drink that is rumored to have qualities as an aphrodisiac.

Operations

Brugal has Distilleries in Puerto Plata where the rums are produced. The distribution and marketing offices are located in the capital city of Santo Domingo, and there is also a regional office in Santiago de los Caballeros, the Dominican Republic's second largest city. The company creates several varieties of rum, each with a distinctive taste.

Brugal has international presence in many of the Caribbean islands, the United States, Canada, India and Europe, where Spain and Italy are the largest consumers.

Edrington acquisition

On February 6, 2008, Brugal & Co. made public that The Edrington Group, a large Scottish distilling company, won control of the company by acquiring a majority shareholding. In a press release, the Brugal family assured that production will continue within the Dominican Republic and that they will remain as shareholders and have an active role in managing the company and brand.

Figures published indicate that the price paid by Edrington for a holding of just over 60% (other sources cite up to 83% ) was in excess of £200million.

Brands and varieties

 Carta Dorada (golden low-tier)
 Ron Blanco (white low-tier)
 Ron Blanco 151 (white high-proof for mixing cocktails)
 Añejo (golden mid-tier)
 Extra Viejo (golden premium)
 XV (golden high-end premium)
 Titanium (white high-end premium)
 Brugal Leyenda (golden high-end premium)
 Siglo de Oro (golden high-end porcelain-bottled premium blend)
 Papá Andrés (golden super high-end premium blend)
 Licor Único (rum liqueur)
 Limón (alcopop)

A number of Brugal rums have been submitted at international spirit ratings organizations for review. The Extra Viejo has performed reasonably well. Wine Enthusiast awarded it scores of "90-95" in 2009, while the San Francisco World Spirits Competition gave it a silver medal in that same year.

References

Distilleries
Rums
Food and drink companies of the Dominican Republic
Food and drink companies established in 1888
1888 establishments in North America
1880s establishments in the Caribbean